The Latvijas Basketbola līga 2011–2012 (LBL) is the twenty-first season. The regular season starts in October 2011.

Participants 
VEF Rīga
BK Ventspils
Liepājas Lauvas
BK Valmiera
BA Turība
LU/Latvijas Universitāte
BK Jelgava
Jūrmala
Latvia U18

Regular season

Playoffs

Awards

Players of the month

See also
VTB United League 2011–12
Baltic Basketball League 2011–12

References

External links 
 Latvian Basketball League

Latvijas Basketbola līga
Latvian
Basketball
Basketball